The Korean Central Broadcasting Station (KCBS) is a domestic radio service operated by the Korean Central Broadcasting Committee, a state-owned broadcaster in North Korea.

History
KCBS was established on 14 October 1945 as
Pyongyang Broadcasting Station after the Korea liberation from Japan. The station later was renamed as Korea Central Broadcasting Station in February 1948.

Broadcasts
KCBS broadcasts from 5 am to 3 am via a network of mediumwave and shortwave transmitters that cover the nation. The powerful transmissions can easily be heard in neighbouring countries, including South Korea where some of its frequencies are jammed. It is also relayed at certain times via the Voice of Korea, the North Korea international shortwave service. Its interval signal is identical to that of Korean Central Television and Voice of Korea. KCBS also broadcasts on the ChinaSat 12 satellite.

Programming
A central programme is broadcast from Pyongyang on most transmitters through the entire broadcast day, though some are reported to carry regional programming between 2 pm and 3 pm. All programming is in Korean and includes music, talk and news. Main news bulletins are broadcast at 6 am, 7 am, 10 am, midday, 3 pm, 5 pm, 8 pm, 9 pm and 10 pm.

Stations

See also
Propaganda in North Korea
List of radio stations in North Korea
Censorship in North Korea
Media of North Korea

References

 
Radio stations in North Korea
North Korean propaganda organizations
Mass media in Pyongyang
Propaganda radio broadcasts
Radio stations established in 1945
1945 establishments in Korea